Cloudscape photography is photography of clouds or sky.  

An early cloudscape photographer, Belgian photographer Léonard Misonne (1870–1943), was noted for his black and white photographs of heavy skies and dark clouds. 

In the early to middle 20th century, American photographer Alfred Stieglitz (1864–1946) created a series of photographs of clouds, called "equivalents" (1925–1931). According to an essay on the series at the Phillips Collection website, "A symbolist aesthetic underlies these images, which became increasingly abstract equivalents of his own experiences, thoughts, and emotions". More recently, photographers such as Ralph Steiner, Robert Davies and Tzeli Hadjidimitriou have been noted for producing such images.

Examples

See also
 Aerial landscape art
 Cloud Appreciation Society
 Cloudscape (art)
 Landscape

References

Sources and readings
Davies, Robert;  Christopher Bucklow;  "Cloudscapes"; Lisbon (Portugal). Arquivo Fotográfico Municipal.  (Lisboa, Portugal: Câmara Municipal, Cultura: Arquivo fotográfico, 1997)  [Worldcat subject headings include "Davies, Robert" and  "Photography of clouds"]
Steiner, Ralph. Smith College. "In pursuit of clouds : images and metaphors"; Museum of Art. (Albuquerque, N.M.: Distributed by the University of New Mexico Press, ©1985)  [Photography of clouds]
Hadjidimitriou, Tzeli. Time fading into clouds | O χρόνος χάθηκε στα σύννεφα. Texts from: N. Vatopoulos, N. Chronas, Tz. Hadjidimitriou, Metaichmio, 2003,

External links
Official Home Page of Cloud Appreciation Society

Clouds
Photography by genre